Villa Zone is a Bulgarian comedy-drama film released in 1975, directed by Eduard Zahariev, starring Itzhak Fintzi, Katya Paskaleva, Naum Shopov, Anton Karastoyanov, Evstati Stratev, Valcho Kamarashev and Georgi Rusev.

The movie presents the popular tradition in Bulgaria, during the last decades of the 20th century, of organizing a feast in honor of just graduated at the school boys who have to join the army as recruits. In this particular case, the event is taking place in one of the so-called villa zones which are located around the towns. A sunny autumn day is gradually covered by the conflicts between generations, between neighbors and between different social statuses.

The film won a Special Prize of the Jury at the Karlovy Vary International Film Festival. Villa Zone is one of the hits of the Bulgarian cinematography from those years.

Cast
Itzhak Fintzi as Yonko (Emo's father)
Katya Paskaleva as Stefka (Yonko's wife)
Naum Shopov as Mincho Minchev (Yonko's brother-in-law, Stefka's brother) 
Anton Karastoyanov as Pervazov (the "problem" neighbour)
Evstati Stratev as the correspondence student
Valcho Kamarashev as the cousin
Georgi Rusev as a friend neighbour 
Stefka Berova as Mihaylova
Ivan Yanchev as Nedev (Yonko's boss)
Nevena Simeonova as Nedev's wife 
Grozdan Dobrev as Emo (Yonko and Stefka's son)

References

Sources

External links
 
 Villa Zone at the Bulgarian National Television 

1970s Bulgarian-language films
Bulgarian comedy-drama films
Films set in Bulgaria
Films shot in Bulgaria
1975 films
1975 comedy-drama films
Films directed by Eduard Sachariev